Dietzia cercidiphylli is a bacterium from the genus Dietzia which has been isolated from roots of the tree Cercidiphyllum japonicum in China.

References

Further reading

External links
Type strain of Dietzia cercidiphylli at BacDive -  the Bacterial Diversity Metadatabase	

Mycobacteriales
Bacteria described in 2008